Strophotina niphochondra is a species of moth of the family Tortricidae. It is found in the  Federal District of Brazil.

References

Moths described in 1999
Euliini